Cliffside is an unincorporated community in Potter County, located in the U.S. state of Texas.

History
Prior to the community's existence, the Fort Worth and Denver Railway opened a station here in 1888. The first schoolhouse opened in 1905, with the town being platted out on August 5, 1915. From 1908–1917, a Post Office operated out of a general store, but has discontinued due to its nearness to Amarillo, Texas. By 1980, Cliffside only had a few small red buildings besides the railroad track. From the 1960s through 2000, the population estimates were recorded at 206.

References

Unincorporated communities in Potter County, Texas
Unincorporated communities in Texas